Buckeye Lake State Park is a public recreation area in Fairfield, Licking and Perry counties, Ohio in the United States. Shore areas and islands include Brooks Park, Fairfield Beach, Liebs Island, Mud Island and North Shore. Activities include boating, fishing, swimming, picnicking, wildlife observation. and winter recreation. Wildlife visible in or from the park include cormorants, herons, bald eagles, osprey, and numerous waterfowl.

History
The park is named for Buckeye Lake, which under its original name, Licking Summit Reservoir, was built in the 19th century to supply water to the Ohio and Erie Canal. After the 1894 Ohio General Assembly declared that feeder reservoirs should be established as public parks, the reservoir's name was changed to Buckeye Lake. In 1949, the area became Buckeye Lake State Park once the Ohio Department of Natural Resources was created.

References

External links
Buckeye Lake State Park Ohio Department of Natural Resources
Buckeye Lake State Park Map Ohio Department of Natural Resources

State parks of Ohio
Protected areas of Fairfield County, Ohio
Protected areas of Licking County, Ohio
Protected areas of Perry County, Ohio
Protected areas established in 1949
1949 establishments in Ohio